The Australian Ice Hockey League (AIHL) is Australia's top-level ice hockey league. Established in 2000, the AIHL is sanctioned by Ice Hockey Australia (a member of the International Ice Hockey Federation). The league is run by its own board of directors led by the AIHL commissioner. The AIHL is considered a semi-professional league with players receiving a variety of benefits such as a weekly stipend, travel expenses, motor vehicles and accommodation. The AIHL champion is awarded the Goodall Cup, the world's third oldest ice hockey trophy, having been first awarded in 1909. The AIHL is currently contested by eight franchised teams from five Australian states and territories. The most successful team in AIHL history is the Newcastle Northstars, which has claimed six AIHL championships. The current champions, from 2022, are the CBR Brave.

History
The Australian Ice Hockey League (AIHL) was formed in 2000 following the collapse of the former national league. In its first season, the AIHL comprised three teams – the Adelaide Avalanche, Canberra Knights, and the Sydney Bears. During the first two seasons the teams competed in round-robin weekends over the length of the season, with the two top teams playing a single final. Adelaide Avalanche finished first in both years after the regular season, with the Sydney Bears winning the Goodall Cup in the 2001 playoffs. In 2002 the AIHL expanded to six teams with the inclusion of the Melbourne Ice, Newcastle North Stars and the West Sydney Ice Dogs. The Sydney Bears finished first in the regular season standings and won the Goodall Cup playoffs. At the start of the 2003 AIHL season it was announced that the finals playoff would be expanded to include the top four finishing teams after the regular season. Newcastle North Stars won their first regular season and their first Goodall Cup. The following season the West Sydney Ice Dogs won their first Goodall Cup after defeating the Newcastle North Stars in the final. In 2005 the AIHL expanded to eight teams with the Central Coast Rhinos and the Brisbane Blue Tongues joining the league. During the 2005 season the Avalanche signed former National Hockey League (NHL) player Steve McKenna who played over 350 games in the NHL while the North Stars won their second Goodall Cup. In 2006 the Brisbane Blue Tongues signed Canadian Rob Zamuner who had played nearly 800 games in the NHL. The North Stars went on to win their second consecutive Goodall Cup title, defeating Adelaide for the second year in a row.

The 2007 AIHL season opened with the Avalanche and the Blue Tongues announcing the signing of former NHL players Mel Angelstad and Tyrone Garner respectively. The Bears won the 2007 Goodall Cup, their first since 2002, after defeating the North Stars in the final. Starting the 2008 season the Brisbane Blue Tongues announced their relocation to the Gold Coast to become the Gold Coast Blue Tongues as well as the signing of former Tampa Bay Lightning player Gaetan Royer. During the season the Adelaide Avalanche folded due to financial problems. Following the withdrawal of the Avalanche a new team was formed, the Adelaide Adrenaline. Newcastle North Stars went on to win the 2008 Goodall Cup, defeating West Sydney Ice Dogs in the final. In 2009 the Central Coast Rhinos left the league after refusing to accept the AIHL's new licensing model and went on to join the newly formed Australian International Ice Hockey Cup. 2009 also saw the Goodall Cup withdrawn from the AIHL by Ice Hockey Australia so it could return to being a state contested tournament. It was replaced by the H. Newman Reid Trophy which was won by the Adrenaline. The following season Ice Hockey Australia returned the Goodall Cup to the AIHL with the H. Newman Reid Trophy being consigned to be the prize for the winner of the regular season. Melbourne Ice won their first Goodall Cup, defeating the Adrenaline in the final 6–4. In 2011 the league returned to an eight team competition with the inclusion of the Melbourne-based Mustangs IHC. The AIHL also granted a ninth team, the Perth Thunder, a provisional licence to play exhibition games during the 2011 season and potentially securing a vote to join the league in 2012.

In August 2011 the AIHL and the New Zealand Ice Hockey League (NZIHL) announced the formation of the Trans-Tasman Champions League. The Trans-Tasman Champions League began in 2012 and was hosted in Australia, with the series shifting to New Zealand in 2013. The series features two teams from each the AIHL and the NZIHL each playing the others once with the winner being the team who finishes first in the round-robin standings. The two teams chosen from each league will be the regular season champions and the winner of the playoff. In a situation where the winning of both events is the same the runner up of the playoff final will be selected to represent their respective league. Melbourne Ice won both the H. Newman Reid Trophy and the Goodall Cup after finishing first in the 2011 regular season standings and winning the playoffs after defeating the Newcastle North Stars in the final. In November 2011 following the annual general meeting it was announced that Perth Thunder had been accepted as a full member of the league expanding the competition to nine teams for 2012. It was also announced that from 2012 the league would be split into two conferences to manage costs and length of the season. The two conferences where named the Bauer Conference and Easton Conference after the AIHL signed a three-year deal with the Skaters Network who is the distributor of the ice hockey brands Bauer Hockey and Easton Hockey. The Bauer Conference will consist of the Canberra Knights, Newcastle North Stars, Sydney Bears, and the Sydney Ice Dogs, while the Easton Conference includes the Adelaide Adrenaline, Gold Coast Blue Tongues, Melbourne Ice, Mustangs IHC and the Perth Thunder. Following the announcement of the conference system a change in the finals playoff structure was also announced. The winners of each conference at the end of the regular season would play in a semi-final against the runner-up of the opposing conference with the winners of the semi-finals progressing to the Goodall Cup final. Prior to the start of the 2012 season the AIHL also announced a one-year partnership with Virgin Australia in which the airline would become the leagues preferred supplier for the 2012 season. The 2012 regular season was won by the Newcastle North Stars after they finished one point ahead of the Melbourne Ice. The Melbourne Ice went on to win the Goodall Cup playoffs for the third year in a row after they defeated the North Stars in the final.

Prior to the start of the 2013 season it was announced that the Gold Coast Blue Tongues' licence had been suspended due to the team being unable to secure a home venue for 2013. It was also announced that the league had entered into a deal with Fox Sports which involved airing one game a week during the season. The 2013 regular season was won by the Sydney Ice Dogs who also went on to win the 2013 Goodall Cup, breaking Melbourne Ice's three-year streak. It was the Ice Dogs first regular season title and their first Goodall Cup since 2004. In February 2014 it was announced that Canberra Knights had folded operations and would not be competing in the 2014 season. Club owner John Raut cited financial costs, lack of local players and poor performance as the reasons behind the move. The following day it was announced that the player group headed by captain Mark Rummukainen had approached the league with plans on taking on the club's licence. The following month the league announced that they had granted a provisional licence to a Canberra consortium, which involved the player group, to take on the licence and replace the Knights in the 2014 season. The new team was announced as the CBR Brave. The Melbourne Mustangs went on to win their first 2014 regular season title and Goodall Cup, defeating the Melbourne Ice in the playoffs final. The Brave, in their debut season, finished the regular season in third and but were knocked out in the semi-finals by the Ice. In December 2014 the Central Coast Rhinos applied to re-enter the league at the 2014 Annual General Meeting however their applicated was rejected for undisclosed reasons. Also during the off-season it was announced that the Gold Coast Blue Tongues' licence had expired, two years after they were suspended due to being unable to secure a home venue.

Between 2015 and 2019, the league had executive changes, game rule changes, exhibition matches in Queensland, the loss of the premier Sydney ice rink and team relocations. In 2015, the Sydney Ice Arena was approved for redevelopment into apartments by the owner, forcing the Sydney Bears to relocate to Penrith. The League adopted the international recognised hybrid icing rule to assist AIHL players in preparation for IIHF competition while continuing to protect players from the risks of potentially damaging collisions. In 2016, the Bears took two regular season games to Brisbane to showcase the league in Queensland for the first time since 2012. Games were held at both Iceworld Boondall and Iceworld Acacia Ridge against the Melbourne Ice. In 2017, following the completion of renovations, the Sydney Bears and Sydney Ice Dogs relocated from Penrith and Liverpool to Macquarie Ice Rink. In 2018, AIHL Commissioner, Rob Bannerman, stepped down after six years in the role. Bannerman would be relocating to the United States to pursue a career change. In 2019, AIHL head of finance, Heidi Wilson, resigned from her role in the league commission. Dawn Watt was elected Deputy Commissioner and the AIHL canvased for new members. David Turik was subsequently appointed the new AIHL Commissioner.

During 2020 and 2021, the league suspended operations due to the outbreak of COVID-19. Different health measures and border restrictions domestically and internationally made it unviable to run seasons in 2020 and 2021. Originally in 2020 the league was suspended but it was later cancelled. In 2021, exhibition series were run instead of the league, but they were interrupted due to the ongoing outbreak. In 2021, AIHL Commissioner, David Turik, resigned from the role by “mutual agreement”, no reasons for his departure were disclosed.

In 2022, the AIHL announced it would be returning to a regular season for the first time since 2019. The League released information of a new board of directors and executive team as well as the adoption of a new finals format and increase to game lengths. The AIHL would implement the international standard 60-minute games (up from 50 minutes) and expanded the finals weekend to include a preliminary final and an additional day in the schedule. The League also announced a new license holder for the Adelaide Adrenaline franchise, headed by Benny Gebert and Glen Foll. A new domestic broadcasting deal was struck with Kayo Sports that will increase the amount of AIHL content broadcast within Australia. Internationally, the league signed a three-year contract with Swiss-based multi-national Sportradar to distribute AIHL broadcasting in North America and Europe. Preparations for the 2022 season was disrupted by the withdrawals of the Perth Thunder and Adelaide Adrenaline due to continued state border restrictions and disagreements with rink management respectively. However, in February 2022, the AIHL announced the expansion of the league would take place in 2023 and followed this up with the granting of licenses to the Brisbane Lightning, headed by Ice Hockey Queensland (IHQ), and the Central Coast Rhinos, who will be returning to the league for the first time in fourteen years after originally leaving at the conclusion of the 2008 season.

Teams

Current teams

Former teams

Timeline

Season Structure

Regular season
The AIHL season commences mid April and runs through to the last weekend of August or the first weekend of September. Games are usually played on Saturday or Sunday, typically starting between 2.00 pm and 5.30 pm depending on the venue.

Teams nominally play each of their seven opponents in the league four times for a total of 28 regular season games. In seasons prior to 2011, some games were played for double-points (and counted as two games) to keep travel costs down.

Match length

The length of matches has changed throughout the history of the AIHL. From inception in 2000 to 2012 matches were forty-five minutes long. From 2013 to 2019 the AIHL increased the match length to fifty minutes, consisting of two fifteen minute periods followed by a twenty-minute third period. On 11 February 2020, the AIHL announced the league would be adopting the international standard sixty minutes match length. The change increased the league's matches by ten minutes and standardised the period lengths to twenty minutes each. The change was scheduled to come into effect for the 2020 season until the season was cancelled. It was finally introduced in the 2022 season.

Overtime and points system
The points system and overtime formats used by the AIHL has developed and changed over the history of the league.

The current points system, first introduced in 2006, follows similar systems widely used in Europe. 3 points is awarded for a win, and 0 points for a loss. If a match is tied at the end of regulation time, overtime (OT) is used to guarantee a match winner. An overtime win is worth 2 points and an overtime loss is worth 1 point.

The current overtime rules deployed in the AIHL for regular season matches was introduced in 2019. At the end of regulation time there is a five-minute three on three overtime period, with the first goal winning the game. If no one scores during this OT period the match is then sent to a shootout to decide the winner and points split.

Between 2000 and 2005, the league had a then NHL style four on four five minute overtime period. If no one scored, the match was then officially recorded as a tie. In 2006 the league removed the five minute overtime period and replaced it with a shootout, meaning every match would have a winner. The shootout only system was used by the league until the end of the 2018 season.

For AIHL finals (play-offs), overtime periods are played to a regulation period length and incorporate the golden goal rule – in an overtime period, the game ends when one team scores a goal; the teams are at full strength (five skaters, barring penalties), there is no shootout, and each overtime period is 20 minutes with full intermissions between overtime periods.

Playoffs
Between 2000 and 2002 the AIHL had a single match final, known as the championship final, between the two teams who finished first and second in the regular round-robin season. In 2002, the Goodall Cup was awarded to the winner of the championship final for the first time, previously it was used as the award for the annual inter-state tournament held by IHA. In 2003, the AIHL switched to a four team playoff system, expanding the format into a 'finals weekend'. Retaining the single-match series, two semi-finals and a final would be played at a single venue over one weekend. The top four teams from the regular season qualify for the finals weekend. The two semi finals are conducted on the Saturday with 1 v 4 (semi final 1) playing first followed by 2 v 3 (semi final 2). The winners of the two semi finals advance to the final, held on the Sunday, to compete for the Goodall Cup and the AIHL Championship.

In 2022, the league expanded the finals format by adding a preliminary final and a third day to the schedule. Semi-finals are played on Friday night. The top two teams from the AIHL regular season play-off in the major semi-final for an automatic spot in the Sunday afternoon Goodall Cup final. The teams who finished third and fourth in the regular season play-off in an elimination game in the minor semi-final. The winner of the minor semi-final advances to the preliminary final to play the loser of the major semi-final. The winner of the Saturday afternoon preliminary final progresses to the Goodall Cup final and the loser is eliminated. The winner of the grand final is named AIHL Champion and lifts the historic Goodall Cup.

As of 2022, finals have been held in three different Australian states including New South Wales, South Australia and Victoria, six cities including, Sydney, Adelaide, Central Coast, Newcastle, Penrith and Melbourne and eight stadiums as detailed in the table below:

League champions

AIHL champions by seasons (2000-present)

AIHL champions all-time record

Trophies and awards

Goodall Cup

The champions of the AIHL are awarded the Goodall Cup, a perpetual national trophy third in age only to the Stanley Cup (1892) and the Allan Cup (1908). The Goodall Cup was incorporated into the AIHL in 2002 after the league expanded to 6 teams. The Goodall Cup is awarded to the team that wins the Finals series/playoffs weekend at the end of each season. The team that holds the Goodall Cup is considered to be the Australian champion.

The Goodall Cup was withdrawn from the AIHL in 2009 by the cup's custodians, Ice Hockey Australia. The Goodall Cup was instead awarded to South Australia in a traditional state vs state tournament held in Adelaide, South Australia in October 2009 as a 100-year celebration of the Goodall Cup.

In 2010 the Goodall Cup was offered back to the AIHL, and the cup accepted by a vote of the members and board. The Goodall Cup has been re-instated by the AIHL as its finals tournament trophy and as the prize signifying Australian champions of ice hockey.

Like in the case of the Stanley Cup, the original Goodall Cup is considered too delicate to travel and a replica is now awarded to the league champion team.

Mick McCormack Cup
First awarded in 2015, the Mick McCormack Cup is awarded annually to the most valuable player of the Australian Ice Hockey League All-Star Game. As of 2018, the Cup was re-purposed as the award to the winning team of the Australian Ice Hockey League All-Star Game.

The trophy is named after Australian ice hockey advocate, Mick McCormack, who is the CEO of APA Group.

Recipients of the Mick McCormack Cup include Pat O’Kane from the Melbourne Mustangs (2015), Michael Dorr of Perth Thunder (2016), and Dominic Jalbert of CBR Brave (2017). Team Rezek won the cup in 2018.

AIHL Champions Trophy
In 2009 Ice Hockey Australia withdrew the Goodall Cup from the AIHL, claiming it was instead to presented to the winning team from IHA's own tournament to be run in South Australia, celebrating the Cup's 100th anniversary since it was first awarded in a game between NSW and Victoria in 1909. Without a major trophy to present to its finals winning team, the AIHL designed and had manufactured its own unique trophy.

The new AIHL Champions Trophy was awarded to the 2009 AIHL Champions, the Adelaide Adrenaline following their victory in the 2009 final.

In 2010 the AIHL Champions Trophy was re-launched as the H Newman Reid Trophy, honouring the minor premiers from each season back to 2008.

H Newman Reid Trophy

The H Newman Reid Trophy is awarded to the regular season's minor premiers; that is, the team that finishes first overall in the standings.
Reid is considered the father of ice hockey in Australia, opening Australia's first two ice rinks and employing key people who introduced Australians, including his own children, to winter sports.

The H Newman Reid Trophy was first awarded in 2010 to the Newcastle North Stars after they finished first in the regular season with 54 points.

The Reid Trophy was backdated to 2008 including minor premiers the Sydney Bears (2008) and the Newcastle North Stars (2009 & 2010).

V.I.P. Cup

The V.I.P. Cup was awarded to the minor premiers of each season; that is, the team that finishes first overall in the standings at the end of the regular season. The VIP cup was last awarded to the Adelaide Avalanche in 2007. The VIP Cup was not returned to the league and has been replaced by the H Newman Reid Trophy.

Wilson Cup

The Wilson Cup is awarded to the winner of the AIHL pre-season competition, which began in 2007 and ran again in 2008 and 2009. No Wilson Cup was run in 2010 or 2011.

Records

All-time skater totals
 
Top-ten skater totals in six categories. For PPG, to qualify for the list, a player must have played a minimum 20 matches in the AIHL.

Legend:

By season totals
 
Top-ten season totals for skaters and goaltender in four categories. For goaltenders, to qualify for lists, a player must have played a minimum 10 AIHL matches in a season.

Legend:

Season awards
AIHL season awards are announced near or at the end of the regular season, with the Finals MVP announced after the conclusion of the Goodall Cup Final. Below is the known history of AIHL award winners.

References:

Media coverage
Damien Ketlo, the 2017 save percentage leader, became a contestant on Big Brother Canada season 7 and mentioned Australian Hockey in episode 22.

See also

Players in the AIHL
List of AIHL seasons
Australian Women's Ice Hockey League
New Zealand Ice Hockey League

References

External links
Official website
Ice Hockey Australia
Elite Prospects – AIHL

 
Sports leagues established in 2000
Professional ice hockey leagues in Australia
2000 establishments in Australia